Samraong is a khum (commune) of Ou Chrov District in Banteay Meanchey Province in north-western Cambodia.

Villages

 Banlech(បន្លិច)
 Neak Ta Chhor(អ្នកតាឈរ)
 Samraong(សំរោង)
 Kampong Reab(កំពង់រាប)
 Thmei(ថ្មី)
 Thmenh Trei(ធ្មេញត្រី)
 Bat Trang(បត់ត្រង់)
 Anhchanh(អញ្ចាញ)
 Voat(វត្ដ)
 Kandal(កណ្ដាល)

References

Communes of Banteay Meanchey province
Ou Chrov District